Liu Chen (劉晨) and Ruan Zhao were semi-legendary figures active during the Han dynasty, known for their trip to Tiantai Mountain. First described in the early fifth-century zhiguai anthology Youming lu, the legend of Liu Chen and Ruan Zhao has been depicted in paintings, plays, and poetry.

Synopsis
The legend of Liu Chen and Ruan Zhao was first described in the zhiguai anthology Youming lu, whose authorship is attributed to Liu Yiqing (403–444). It is recollected in the Taiping Yulan. In the fifth year of the Yongping Emperor, Shengzhou natives Liu Chen (劉晨) and Ruan Zhao head to Tiantai Mountain to procure medicinal herbs, whereupon they encounter a couple of beautiful maidens in a valley of peach blossoms. They cohabit with them but begin to feel homesick after half a year. However, Liu and Ruan return home discover that hundreds of years have elapsed after meeting their seventh-generation grandchildren. In the eighth year of the Taiyuan reign of the Jin dynasty, Liu and Ruan disappear again, this time apparently forever.

Depictions
Painted on a Cizhou ware pillow, dating back to the Jin dynasty and currently housed at the Palace Museum in Beijing, are "two gentlemen crossing a bridge and walking towards a cloudy ravine"; according to scholar Li Qingquan, the two men are Liu and Ruan. The Yuan dynasty playwright Wang Ziyi adapted the story into a play titled Liu Chen Ruan Zhao wu ru taoyuan or Liu Chen and Ruan Zhao Strayed into the Land of Peach Blossoms. Yuan painter Zhao Cangyun's "most famous painting" is on the handscroll Liu Chen and Ruan Zhao Entering the Tiantai Mountains, which has been on display at the Metropolitan Museum of Art since September 1999; the handscroll also features inscriptions by Zhao and is accompanied by colophons by Zhao Heqin, Hua Youwu, Yao Guangxiao, and Song Yong.

Allusions
The previously unpublished autobiographical account of Zhang Daye's (1854–?) life during and after the Taiping Rebellion—whose manuscript was rediscovered and translated into English by Xiaofei Tian as The World of a Tiny Insect in 2013—begins thus:  Tian writes that Zhang's "deliberate discursive choice" of evoking the legend of Liu Chen and Ruan Zhao with the phrase "trip to Tiantai" serves to create an "ironic reversal of the idyllic, if legendary, past"; moreover, while Zhang did pass by the mountain, his final destination was his friend Yuan Jichuan's residence in Shaoxing.

References

Citations

Bibliography

 
 
 
 
 
 

Male characters in literature
Legendary Chinese people